The 2011 MLS Expansion Draft was held on November 23, 2011 as a special draft for the Major League Soccer expansion team Montreal Impact.

Format
Source
 Existing teams were allowed to protect 11 players from their rosters. Generation Adidas players were automatically protected, though players who graduated from the program to the senior roster at the end of the 2011 season were not.
Homegrown players on the team's off-budget roster were automatically protected and did not count against each team's 11 protected roster spots.
Designated players only had to be protected if they had a no-trade clause.
Existing clubs had to submit their protected rosters to MLS by November 21, 2011. The protected rosters were made public later that day.

Expansion draft results

Riley was immediately traded to Chivas USA with allocation money for Justin Braun and Gerson Mayen.

Team-by-team-breakdown

Chicago Fire

Chivas USA

Colorado Rapids

Columbus Crew

D.C. United

FC Dallas

Houston Dynamo

Los Angeles Galaxy

New England Revolution

New York Red Bulls

Philadelphia Union

Portland Timbers

Real Salt Lake

San Jose Earthquakes

Seattle Sounders FC

Sporting Kansas City

Toronto FC

Vancouver Whitecaps FC

References

Major League Soccer Expansion Draft
Expansion Draft
MLS Expansion Draft